Lingelsheimia is a plant genus in the families Phyllanthaceae (and previously placed in the family Putranjivaceae), first described as a genus in 1909. It  is native to central Africa and Madagascar.

Species
 Lingelsheimia abbayesii (Leandri) Radcl.-Sm. - Madagascar
 Lingelsheimia ambigua  (Leandri) Radcl.-Sm. - Madagascar
 Lingelsheimia fiherenensis (Leandri) Radcl.-Sm. - Madagascar
 Lingelsheimia frutescens Pax - Gabon, Zaire
 Lingelsheimia manongarivensis  (Leandri) G.L.Webster - Madagascar
 Lingelsheimia sylvestris  (Radcl.-Sm.) Radcl.-Sm. - Tanzania

References

Phyllanthaceae
Flora of Africa
Malpighiales genera